Mikhail Vitalievich Gorevoy (born 19 May 1965) is a Soviet and Russian actor, occasionally credited as Michael Gor in English language productions, best known internationally for playing Vladimir Popov in the James Bond film Die Another Day.  He also played the role of Ivan Alexandrovich Schischkin in Bridge of Spies.

Early life
Mikhail Gorevoy graduated with honors from the Moscow Art Theater School in 1987, and began his acting career in theater at the Sovremennik Theatre.

Career
His film debut was in the 1988 Russian film Step (directed by Alexander Mitta). He traveled to the United States in 1992, living in New York City and Boston, where he worked various jobs including teaching the Stanislavski method. Gorevoy returned to Russia in 1996 and established his own theater. He continues to act in film.

Personal life
Gorevoy has one son, Dmitriy, who is also an actor. He was a major in the Soviet Army.

Filmography

References

External links
  (in Russian)
 

Living people
1965 births
Soviet male film actors
Soviet male television actors
Soviet male stage actors
Soviet male actors
Male actors from Moscow
Russian male film actors
Russian male television actors
Russian male stage actors
20th-century Russian male actors
21st-century Russian male actors
Russian directors
Russian theatre directors
Russian educational theorists
Moscow Art Theatre School alumni